Marko Anđelković (born 12 October 1984 in Zagreb) is a Serbian footballer who plays as a midfielder for FK Budućnost Dobanovci in the Serbian First League.

Career
He was for many years FK Partizan player, but never got to play any official match with them, instead he was being loaned to other clubs to gain experience. He played 3 seasons with Partizan's satellite club FK Teleoptik.

In summer 2005 he was loaned to 1998 national champions FK Obilić and played his only matches in the Serbian top league.

He also played with FK Napredak Kruševac and FK Dinamo Vranje in the Second League before signing, on 23 February 2007, with Swiss club AC Bellinzona where he played until summer 2008. Afterward, he returned to Serbia and signed with FK Voždovac where he played one season, before moving in summer 2009 to the ambitious FK Inđija.

In winter of 2011 he joined Lithuanian Champions FK Ekranas.

In winter of 2013 he joined for the Israeli football club, Ironi Ramat HaSharon

In March 2015 he joined newly promoted Icelandic top division team ÍA.

References

External links
 Profile at PrvaLigaSrbije.

1984 births
Living people
Footballers from Zagreb
Serbs of Croatia
Serbian footballers
Association football midfielders
FK Teleoptik players
FK Obilić players
FK Napredak Kruševac players
AC Bellinzona players
FK Voždovac players
FK Inđija players
FK Ekranas players
FC Viitorul Constanța players
Hapoel Nir Ramat HaSharon F.C. players
Israeli Premier League players
Liga I players
Serbian expatriate footballers
Expatriate footballers in Israel
Expatriate footballers in Switzerland
Expatriate footballers in Romania